Morteza Mahjubi (1900 – 21 March 1965) was an Iranian pianist and composer. He was a piano soloist for the Golha radio programme.

Early life 
Morteza Mahjubi was born in 1900, in Tehran, Iran. His father, Abbas Ali, known as Nazer, played the Ney. His mother, Fakhr-o-SSaadaat, played the piano. Mahjubi's parents sent him, along with his older brother Reza, to Hossein Hang Afarin who taught Reza the violin and Morteza the piano.

At the age of ten, Morteza performed a concert accompanying Aref Qazvini in cinema Farus. In the following years, he went on to perform with other musicians including Darvish Khan, Seyyed Hossein Taherzadeh, and Hossein Esmail Zadeh.

Teachers 
His first teacher was Hossein Hang Afarin, from whom he learned the preliminary studies. He was then sent to Mahmoud Mofakham to further his studies of the piano and radif. He also studied with other musicians, including Darvish Khan, Hossein Esmail Zadeh, Hajikhan Zarbgir, and Seyyed Hossein Taherzadeh.

Performance style 

Mahjubi's performance style was improvisational. According to Navvab Safa, he never planned or prepared for his performances, and if he played a piece ten times he would play it differently each time.

Compositions 
Mahjubi has composed many tasnifs (ballads), pīshdarāmads (rhythmic preludes), and rengs (rhythmic pieces). A noteworthy example is his composition "Man az Rooze Azal Divane Boodam" ("I Was Bewildered From Pre-eternity"). This tasnif has been performed by Gholam-Hossein Banan. While Mahjubi was unfamiliar with western notation, he devised a notation system similar to Siaaq (a set of symbols used in premodern times to note the weight of merchandise or monetary figures), which he used to transcribe musical ideas.

Students 

Mahjubi had many students the most famous of whom is Fakhri Malekpour who studied with Mahjubi over a period of twelve years.

References 

1900 births
Persian musicians
Iranian pianists
1965 deaths
20th-century pianists